The 2016 Greater Hyderabad Municipal Corporation election was conducted on 2 February 2016 to elect members to all 150 wards of the municipal corporation. The Telangana Rashtra Samithi won a landslide victory of 99 wards, followed by the All India Majlis-e-Ittehadul Muslimeen which received 44 wards. The Indian National Congress, which was the single-largest party in the previous GHMC elections held in 2010, was decimated, winning only 2 wards.

Election schedule 
The Telangana State Election Commission announced the schedule for the GHMC election on 8 January 2022.

Results By Ward 
The results were announced on 5 February 2016, the Telangana Rashtra Samithi won a strong majority of 99 seats in the municipal corporation, riding on the wave of achieving the independent state of Telangana after years of protests and hunger strikes. The All India Majlis-e-Ittehadul Muslimeen retained its old city bastion whereas the main parties in the last election, the Indian National Congress and the Telugu Desam Party were decimated, with most of their voters switching to the TRS. Almost 1,000 of the total 1,333 candidates lost their deposit, failing to garner 1/6th of the total vote.

References 

Greater Hyderabad Municipal Corporation
2016 elections in India
Hyderabad
Local elections in Telangana